Jim Grabb and Patrick McEnroe were the defending champions but did not compete that year.

Trevor Kronemann and David Macpherson won in the final 6–4, 3–6, 6–3 against Richey Reneberg and Jonathan Stark.

Seeds
Champion seeds are indicated in bold text while text in italics indicates the round in which those seeds were eliminated.

 Tommy Ho /  Brett Steven (first round)
 Rick Leach /  Scott Melville (semifinals)
 Richey Reneberg /  Jonathan Stark (final)
 Trevor Kronemann /  David Macpherson (champions)

Draw

External links
 1996 Sybase Open Doubles draw

SAP Open
1996 ATP Tour